Augustin Meinrad Bächtiger (May 12, 1888, Mörschwil – May 4, 1971, Gossau) was a Swiss painter.

References
This article was initially translated from the German Wikipedia.

Literature

 Isabella und Daniel Studer-Geisser: Augustin Meinrad Bächtiger (1888–1971), ein Gossauer Künstler zwischen Tradition und Moderne, published by the Oberberger Blättern 1988/1989, Pages 34 – 43, Publisher Cavelti AG, Gossau.

20th-century Swiss painters
20th-century Swiss male artists
Swiss male painters
1888 births
1971 deaths